L. nana may refer to:
 Lemuresthes nana, the Madagascar munia, a finch species native to Madagascar
 Lodderena nana, a minute sea snail species
 Lysibia nana, a hyperparasitoid wasp

See also
 Nana (disambiguation)